The Taino were the indigenous people of the Caribbean and the principal inhabitants of Cuba, the Dominican Republic, Haiti, Jamaica, and Puerto Rico. Caribbean archaeologists have theorized that by the mid 16th century the native people of the Caribbean were extinct. However, the story of Taino extinction may not be the case according to recent research and archaeological findings.

Early Spanish colonization in the Caribbean has been relatively well documented, with textual evidence that has driven interpretations about the Taino in academic literature. But, recent archaeological findings in Puerto Rico, Cuba, and the Dominican Republic have help shed light to the story of the Taino people.

Puerto Rican discoveries 
In Puerto Rico, the land was initially populated by a pre-agricultural people during a period of occupation known as the Archaic. The most significant data to be released from this period of occupation comes from the Maria del la Cruz cave; located on the northeastern side of the coastal town of Loiza. Typically, this period is characterized “by the absence of agriculture and pottery, semi-nomadic living in small bands, [with] frequent use of caves for shelter and burials ... [and] crude artifacts made of conch shells, flint and other stones.” In Puerto Rico, the Archaic period is recognized by pebble-grinders, pitted hammer stones, and pebble chopper. With these discoveries, recent carbon samples were obtained from the Maria de la Cruz cave producing a date of 40±100 years A.D.. This date would indicate the entrance of the Archaic period began around the beginning of the Christian era.

Archaeologist Chris Espenshade found a midden mound and 400 burials in south-central Puerto Rico in Municipio Ponce. The burial site dates back to the research done in the Maria del la Cruz cave. The major occupations of the site were from 600 to 900 AD and from 1300 to 1500 AD.” Espenshade states the site contained “the presence of apparently extra-local pottery made by many different potters, the presence of extra-local faunal resources (including marine shellfish), the presence and use of pine resin from an off-island source, the strong representation of medicinal and ceremonial plants, the presence of suspected high-status foods, and the evidence for gathering and properly preparing porcupine fish consistent with the expectations of public ceremonies rather than everyday domestic activities.

Archaeologist Ricardo Alegria discovered similar evidence in 1948 of some of the earliest recorded agriculture and pottery remains at another site on the island known as the Hacienda Grande. The pottery in the area were characterized as “thin, hard, and fine-grained [sherds]… with varied, but bell-shaped bowls and flat-based bottles.”

Dominican discoveries 
Historian Frank Moya Pons states during the early period of Spanish colonization in the Dominican Republic a process "of transculturation began whereby Taino's mixed within the Spanish population, together with African slaves, giving rise to a new Creole culture."

The most notable Taino site in the Dominican Republic is on the southeastern coast of the island at the mouth of the Yuma River known as El Atajadizo. The ceramics at this site include flint, coral, and stone tools dating back to about 300 BCE. According to researchers, multiple layers of occupation have given way to the development of a very large village about 1300 ACE old; centered by a cobblestone-paved plaza surrounding by public buildings.

Another notable Taino site is Chacuey, found on the northwestern side of the island along the Chacuey River. This site is well-known for its petroglyphs and impressive stonework of extensive enclosed plazas and sophisticated roadways. The plaza is approximately 600 meters long and enclosed by standing stones covered in petroglyphs of human-like faces leading to the river.

Cuban discoveries 
In Cuba, the Archaic tradition is represented by the pre-ceramic findings of rock-shelters and coastal shell-midden sites. Therefore, some of the oldest sites on the island are located in caves and rock shelters on the interior valleys along the coast. These caves and shelters include ceramics like shell gouges, shell celts, vessels, and dishes made out of conch shells.

Levisa rock shelter, in the Levisa River valley, is the oldest found record of Archaic tools in Cuba dating to about 4000 BC. At this site, there is evidence of stone tools, such as hammerstones, shell artifacts, polished stone balls, and pendants.

Most of the Taino settlements in Cuba were located in the eastern part of the island with few containing burial sites and some examples of petroglyphs on the north side of the island as well. There are many examples of Taino sites in Cuba including La Campana, El Mango, and Pueblo Viejo archaeological sites. These sites are similar to each other in that they contain large plazas with enclosed areas.

References 

Taíno
Caribbean people
Caribbean culture